The Ruisseau des Meules (in English: millstone stream) is a tributary of the west bank of the rivière du Moulin whose current flows on the west bank of the Chaudière River; the latter flowing northward to empty on the south shore of the St. Lawrence River. It flows in the municipality of Saint-Alfred, in the Robert-Cliche Regional County Municipality, in the administrative region of Chaudière-Appalaches, in Quebec, in Canada.

Geography 
The main neighboring watersheds of the Meules stream are:
 north side: Mathieu River, Bras Saint-Victor, Chaudière River;
 east side: Chaudière River, rivière du Moulin;
 south side: Noire River, outlet of Lac Fortin;
 west side: Bras Saint-Victor, rivière du Cinq.
7.6
The Meules stream takes its source at the confluence of two streams in an agricultural zone in the municipality of Saint-Alfred.

  east, to a country road;
  north-east, to a road on rang Saint-Alexandre-Sud;
  north-east, to a country road;
  towards the northeast, up to its confluence.

The Meules stream empties on the west bank of the Moulin river, in the municipality of Saint-Alfred.

Toponymy 
The origin of the toponym "Ruisseau des Meules" is linked to the toponym rivière du Moulin by being associated with the molding of the grains. Around 1910, the "Rigaud-Vaudreuil gold fields" made major investments in gold research there.

The toponym "Ruisseau des Meules" was made official on March 6, 1970, at the Commission de toponymie du Québec.

See also 

 List of rivers of Quebec

References 

Rivers of Chaudière-Appalaches
Beauce-Centre Regional County Municipality